Grigory Mikhailovich Pasko (Григо́рий Миха́йлович Пасько, born 19 May 1962, Kreshchenovka, Ukraine) is a military Russian journalist, Amnesty International-designated prisoner of conscience, and founding editor of Ecology and Law, an environmental and citizens' rights magazine.

Life
Pasko was born in the village of Kreshchenovka, Kherson Oblast, currently Ukraine, to a teacher's family. He graduated from the journalism department of Lviv University in 1983, and worked as an investigative journalist and editor for Boyevaya Vakhta (Battle Watch), the in-house newspaper of the Russian Pacific Fleet. He worked with Japanese journalists from the NHK TV network and the Asahi Shimbun national daily newspaper. He had disclosed the dumping of nuclear waste by the Russian Navy in the Sea of Japan in 1993.

Prisoner of conscience 
On 23 November 1997, Pasko was arrested by Russian Federal Security Service agents in Vladivostok. He was accused of espionage for his publications on environmental problems in the Japanese sea, but initially found not guilty, because of the lack of evidence. Due to the efforts of his attorneys, including Ivan Pavlov, Pasko was convicted only for two points of accusation (from sixty). He was found guilty of “abuse of his official position”, but released immediately under a general amnesty.

After several re-trials, the Court of the Pacific Fleet ultimately acquitted Pasko on all counts except espionage, sentencing him to four years of imprisonment for treason on December 25, 2001. He was recognized as a prisoner of conscience by Amnesty International.

In 2003, he was released from detention. Eighteen months later, he was allowed to travel abroad.

Complaints to the European Court 
In October 2009, the European Court of Human Rights rejected the complaints raised by Pasko against Russia under Article 10 ECHR (freedom of expression) by 6 votes to 1:

The court also observed that "as a serving military officer, the applicant had been bound by an obligation of discretion in relation to anything concerning the performance of his duties".

Finally, the European court found that "The domestic courts’ decisions appeared reasoned and well-founded. There had been nothing in the materials of the case to support the applicant’s allegations that his conviction had been overly broad or politically motivated or that he had been sanctioned for any of his publications."

His appeal was rejected in May 2010.

Further work
From 2002-2008, Pasko was the founding editor-in-chief of Ecology and Law, a quarterly magazine published by the St. Petersburg branch of the Environmental Rights Center Bellona.

He is a member of the Russian PEN Center in Vladivostok.

Awards 

While imprisoned in 2002, Pasko received a human rights award from Reporters Without Borders.

See also
 German Ugryumov

References

External links
 Ecology and Law – information about the magazine (in Russian)
 Articles by Pasko, RobertAmsterdam.com
 His biography on the web page of the Russian P.E.N.
 Case of Pasko
 ECHR judgment in Pasko case, 10 May 2010

1962 births
Living people
Amnesty International prisoners of conscience held by Russia
Article 10 of the European Convention on Human Rights
European Court of Human Rights cases involving Russia
People convicted of treason against Russia
University of Lviv alumni
Russian prisoners and detainees
Russian environmentalists
Russian magazine editors
Russian Navy personnel
People from Kherson Oblast
Russian magazine founders
Russian newspaper editors
Russian investigative journalists
Russian male journalists
20th-century Russian male writers